Buyongwe is a town in northern Burundi. It is located in Ngozi Province.

References

Populated places in Burundi
Mining in Burundi